Ampelocissus concinna is a species of flowering plant in the Vitaceae family. It is a climbing vine or liana in the grape family native to Angola.

References

concinna
Plants described in 1868
Flora of Angola
Taxa named by John Gilbert Baker
Taxa named by Jules Émile Planchon